This is a list of protected areas of Romania.

About 5.18% of the area of Romania has a protected  status (12,360 km²), including the Danube Delta, which makes half of these areas (2.43% of Romania's area).

National parks
There are 14 national parks totaling 3,223 km²:

Proposed hunting
The Romanian parliament discussed in September 2008 a bill aiming to open 13 national parks to sustainable hunting, in order to manage the wildlife biodiversity in these areas and promote greater tourism and the accompanying revenue necessary to support and maintain the parks. However, after several protests from environmental organizations, the law was rejected by President Traian Băsescu. Nowadays, hunting is prohibited in national parks of Romania.

Natural parks
There are 17 natural parks totaling 5,492.33 km²:

Natural reserves
Natural reserves are natural areas protected by law in order to protect and conserve important habitats and natural species. The dimensions of natural reserves vary and depend on the area needed by protected natural elements. Besides scientific activities, the administrations of natural reserves encourage traditional activities and ecotourism that do not affect the natural landscape. Here is not permitted to use natural resources.

There are 617 natural reservations totaling 2,043.55 km².

Scientific reserves
Scientific reserves are also protected areas that, like the previous ones, aim at protection and preservation of natural habitats. The difference is that scientific reserves can not be visited by tourists. These areas typically contain rare plant and animal species or particular natural elements, reason why here are prohibited any human activities, excepting research and education activities. Entry without permission in scientific reserves is punishable by considerable fines.

There are 55 such reservations totaling 1,112.77 km².

Natural monuments
There are 234 natural monuments totaling 77.05 km².

References

External links
 World Resources Institute

 
Romania
National parks
Protected areas